Tempus is a Latin word meaning time and a Finnish, Swedish and German word meaning grammatical tense.  It may also refer to:

Arts, entertainment, and media

Television
"Tempus, Anyone?", 1996 episode of Lois & Clark: The New Adventures of Superman
"Tempus", 2011 episode of Sanctuary (season 4)

Other arts, entertainment, and media
Tempus (novel), 1987 novel by Janet Morris
Tempus, in music, as opposed to prolation
Tempus, 2008 poem by Giulio Angioni

Businesses and organizations
Tempus Publishing, an imprint of UK publishing company The History Press
Tempus Sport, a British motorsport team
TEMPUS (Trans-European Mobility Scheme for University Studies), a European Union program

Characters
Tempus (DC Comics), in several episodes of the television series Lois & Clark: The New Adventures of Superman
Tempus, a deity in the Dungeons & Dragons Forgotten Realms fictional universe
Tempus, a demon that could manipulate time in the television series Charmed; portrayed by David Carradine
Tempus, the fictional commander of The Sacred Band of Stepsons series of fantasy novels
Tempus, a Parrot-Ox in Edward Einhorn's novel Paradox in Oz
Tempus (comics), two Marvel Comics characters

See also
 CB Tempus or Club Baloncesto Tempus, a professional basketball club based in Madrid, Spain
 Tempus fugit (disambiguation)